Chaenorhinum minus, also known as small toadflax in Europe and dwarf snapdragon in the US and Canada, is a very diminutive member of the plant family Plantaginaceae. It is native to continental Europe.

Description

Chaenorhinum minus differs from many toadflaxes in having alternate leaves growing singly. Its leaves and sepals are covered with glandular hairs. Leaves are glaucous and sepals are green or purple. Flowers vary from pale purple to white. It is an annual herb, with a maximum height of 25 cm. It does not spread vegetatively. Flowering occurs June–July.

Habitat and distribution

It is such a small plant that it relies upon disturbance to compete with other plants for light. Once a common weed in farmers' fields, it has suffered from agricultural intensification and is now mainly seen in gardens and around railways, as well as roadsides and industrial sites. Its UK distribution shows it favours chalky soil.

This species is native to continental Europe, found mainly in south and central Europe, though it reaches as far north as Sweden. It is considered to have 'archaeophyte' status in the United Kingdom ie. is thought to have been introduced many centuries ago. It has also been introduced to the US and Canada.

Taxonomy

There are considered to be four subspecies of Chaenorhinum minus:

Chaenorhinum minus subsp. anatolicum P.H.Davis (Syn.: Microrrhinum minus subsp. anatolicum (P. H. Davis)NN): found in the Aegeans
Chaenorhinum minus subsp. minus:
Chaenorhinum minus subsp. idaeum (Rech. fil.) R.Fern. (Syn.: Microrrhinum minus subsp. idaeum (Rech. f.) NN): found in Crete
Chaenorhinum minus subsp. pseudorubrifolium (Gamisans)NN (Syn.: Microrrhinum minus subsp. pseudorubrifolium (Gamisans)NN): found in Corsica

References

Plantaginaceae
Flora of Malta